The Murray was a three-masted clipper ship that was built in Scotland in 1861 and lost off the coast of Sweden in 1884. For nearly 20 years the Orient Line sailed her between London and South Australia. In 1880 Norwegian owners bought her and renamed her Freia.

Details
The Murray was the first ship built for the packet service of James Thompson & Co. of London, better known as the Orient Line. She was the last of their ships to be built entirely of wood. Alexander Hall & Co built her in Aberdeen. She was launched on 25 May 1861.

Thompson registered The Murray at Aberdeen. Her United Kingdom official number was 29788 and her code letters were QHCT.

Career as The Murray
Her first master was the highly regarded Captain John Legoe, whose wife named her The Murray. She sailed from Gravesend on her first voyage to Australia in July 1861.

She carried both passengers and cargo, making very fast times.

Captain Legoe, previously of Celestial, was succeeded by James Norval Smart in 1867, William Begg 1869–1872, previously of Sebastian and Coonatto, and Thomas L Wadham 1874–1876.

On the night of 26 May 1870 in mid-Atlantic between Brazil and West Africa, a lookout aboard The Murray saw a ship on fire, and Begg made towards it. It was the Italian barque Mannin Barabino, out of Genoa bound for the River Plate (Puerto Rico) with a cargo of spirits. The fire had started in the galley and swiftly engulfed the ship; the ship's boat was lowered but was soon overloaded and capsized, and the few survivors managed by clinging to the upturned boat or floating spars, and more than 120 were lost by fire or drowning. Captain Begg was awarded a silver medal by the Italian government for his part in the rescue.

Career as Freia
In 1880 OL Roed of Norway bought The Murray, renamed her Freia and registered her in Tønsberg.

In December 1884 Freia sailed from North Shields in England with a cargo of coal for Vrengen in Norway. She was wrecked on the Koster Islands off the west coast of Sweden and lost with all hands.

The Murray in art
The National Maritime Museum in Greenwich, London holds a lithograph Clipper Ship 'The Murray'  (1861) by Thomas Goldsworthy Dutton.

Some other clippers on the route between England and South Australia

References

External links
 – description of travel aboard The Murray in 1871

1861 ships
Full-rigged ships
Maritime incidents in December 1884
Sailing ships of Norway
Sailing ships of the United Kingdom
Ships built by Alexander Hall and Sons
Ships lost with all hands
Shipwrecks of Sweden